Greatest Hits: Songs That Inspired Moana is a compilation album by the Oceanic group Te Vaka, released by Walt Disney Records in 2017. The album consists of songs selected by John Lasseter to encapsulate the history of the band and the sound that inspired the 2016 film Moana, as well as the new song "Lakalaka".

Track listing

References

External links

2017 albums
Te Vaka albums
Walt Disney Records compilation albums